Womagic is the seventeenth studio album by American singer-songwriter Bobby Womack. The album was released in 1986, by MCA Records.

Track listing

References

1986 albums
Bobby Womack albums
Albums produced by Chips Moman
Albums produced by Bobby Womack
MCA Records albums